The Bulgarian Wikipedia is the Bulgarian-language edition of Wikipedia. It was founded on 6 December 2003, and on 12 June 2015 it passed the 200,000 articles threshold. It is written in the Bulgarian (Cyrillic) Alphabet.

Users 

Bulgarian Wikipedia has a Bulgarian alphabet (Cyrillic) interface and users can include Cyrillic letters for their Wikipedia names. The userboxes and all other personal content is in Cyrillic. This is also due to the need of one username for all Wikipedia languages registrations and edits, while many of the Bulgarian Wikipedians also contribute to the English, French, etc. Wikipedias where Cyrillic nicknames may be hard to read or pronounce.

History

The Bulgarian Wikipedia was created on 6 December 2003. In 2005 Bulgarian Wikipedia added its 20,000th article and was the 21st largest Wikipedia at the time. Later in 2007 it was the 30th largest Wikipedia by article count, with over 50,000 articles.
On 24 May 2010, the distinctive Wikipedia globe logo for the Bulgarian Wikipedia was temporarily altered to include the number 100,000 to commemorate the 100,000 article milestone, it became the 32nd largest Wikipedia by size and now it holds 33rd place with more than 200,000 articles.

Timeline
 On 3 October 2004, the 10,000th article was created.
 On 26 December 2007, the 50,000th article.
 On 24 May 2010, the 100,000th article.
 On 17 July 2013, the 150,000th article and
 On 12 June 2015, the 200,000th article.

Multimedia 
As of March 2010 Bulgarian Wikipedia uses only Commons for pictures and multimedia uploads and local uploads are switched off. The existing files are gradually moved to Commons.

References

External links

  Bulgarian Wikipedia
  Bulgarian Wikipedia mobile version

Wikipedias by language
Bulgarian-language websites
Internet in Bulgaria
Bulgarian encyclopedias
Internet properties established in 2003